Algimonas is a genus of bacteria from the family of Hyphomonadaceae. Algimonas occur in marine habitats.

References

Further reading
 

Bacteria genera
Caulobacterales